Chris Jennings (born December 12, 1985) is a former gridiron football running back. He played college football at Arizona and high school football at Fairview High School in Ashland, Kentucky.

He was a member of the Cleveland Browns, Hartford Colonials, New York Jets, Montreal Alouettes and the Toronto Argonauts.

Professional career

Montreal Alouettes
After going undrafted in the 2008 NFL Draft, Jennings drew interest from the Baltimore Ravens and worked out for the Cleveland Browns however, the Browns were not in a position to sign Jennings at the time. Instead, Jennings signed with the Montreal Alouettes of the CFL on June 15, 2008. Jennings was placed on the team's practice squad.

Cleveland Browns
Jennings was signed by the Browns on August 18, 2009. In three preseason games, Jennings ran for 63 yards on 18 carries while catching 7 passes for 69 yards. He was waived by the Browns on September 5 but re-signed to their practice squad two days later. Jennings was promoted to the active roster on October 3 after the team placed James Davis on the injured reserve list.

He made his NFL debut October 4, 2009 for the Browns against the Cincinnati Bengals running for 8 yards on 1 carry. Jennings was primarily used in a reserved role however, he started his first game against Cincinnati on November 29. On December 10, Jennings became the first Browns rookie running back to score a rushing touchdown since Lee Suggs in 2003. It was also the first rushing touchdown by a Browns running back that season. Jennings finished the season having rushed for 220 yards and a touchdown while catching 9 passes for 56 yards.

Jennings was re-signed by the Browns on March 17, 2010 and figured to have a role in the Browns' offense following his positive performance in his rookie season however, he was waived on September 4 as part of the final roster cuts. The Browns decided not to re-sign Jennings, who threatened to seek out other opportunities, despite injuries that plagued running back Peyton Hillis.

Hartford Colonials
Jennings signed with the Hartford Colonials of the UFL on October 21, 2010. Jennings carried the ball only 12 times for 6 yards in his tenure with the Colonials however he was an important contributor to their special teams unit.

New York Jets
Jennings was signed to a future contract by the New York Jets on January 5, 2011. During the Jets' second game of the 2011 preseason he had four carries for 81 yards. He ran 69 yards on one run, which was the longest run from the line of scrimmage by a Jet in the preseason since Curtis Martin ran 80 yards in 1999. He was waived on September 3.

Montreal Alouettes (II) 
Jennings returned to the CFL in the second half of the 2012 CFL season after being released by the New York Jets. He played in 7 of the 18 regular season games that year, compiling 318 yards on the ground and 163 through the air. He received 8 rushing attempts in the first 3 games of the 2013 CFL season before being released by the Alouettes on July 15, 2013.

Toronto Argonauts
The Toronto Argonauts of the CFL, signed Jennings on September 25, 2013. He was released by the Argonauts on October 22, 2013.

Personal life
Jennings resides in Chandler, AZ .

Legal
Jennings allegedly assaulted a doorman on April 17, 2010 at a dance club. The following month, Jennings was not charged with assault as the doorman did not sign the complaint.

Jennings was arrested in Guernsey County, Ohio, on September 5, 2011, for driving 147 MPH, in a 65 MPH zone.

References

External links
Arizona Wildcats bio
Cleveland Browns bio

1985 births
Living people
Sportspeople from Ashland, Kentucky
Players of American football from West Virginia
American players of Canadian football
Canadian football running backs
American football running backs
Arizona Western Matadors football players
Arizona Wildcats football players
Montreal Alouettes players
Cleveland Browns players
New York Jets players
People from Yuma, Arizona